Dancing in Twilight is a 2005 American romantic drama film directed by Bob Roe and starring Mimi Rogers, Erick Avari and Kal Penn.

Cast
Erick Avari as Matt
Louise Fletcher as Evelyn
Mimi Rogers as April
Kal Penn as Sam
Sheetal Sheth as Nicole
Artee Patel as Jai

References

External links
 
 

2005 films
American romantic drama films
2000s English-language films
2000s American films